Juran (fl. 10th century) was a Chinese landscape painter of the late Five Dynasties and Ten Kingdoms and early Northern Song periods.

Very little is known about Juran's life, and not even his family name is known (Juran is his Buddhist name). He was a native of Chiang-Ning and worked at the Southern Tang court in Jinling (today Nanjing). Around 975 Li Houzhu, the ruler of Southern Tang, surrendered to the Northern Song dynasty. Like many, he and his court were to move to the new capital, Bianjing (now Kaifeng); Juran went with them. He lived and worked at the K'ai-pao Buddhist temple in Bianjing, but quickly rose to prominence as landscape painter.

There are a few works that have been attributed to him on various grounds: two hanging scrolls in the collection of the National Palace Museum in Taipei, Taiwan (Storied Mountains and Dense Forests and Xiao Getting the Orchid Pavilion Scroll by Deception), and one hanging scroll in the collection of the Cleveland Museum of Art (Buddhist Monastery by Streams and Mountains). All these works show influence of Dong Yuan's style of rounded contours and soft brushstrokes, but no sign of the older painter's horizontal, level-distance landscape format. According to contemporary sources, Juran also painted a wall painting, Morning Scenery of Haze and Mist, very highly regarded by the artists of the time, but this work is lost.

Gallery

See also
Culture of the Song Dynasty
Chinese painting
Chinese art
History of Chinese art
Orchid Pavilion Gathering

References
 Ci hai bian ji wei yuan hui (辞海编辑委员会) Ci hai (辞海). Shanghai: Shanghai ci shu chu ban she (上海辞书出版社), 1979.
 林茨. The art of Chinese painting (Cultural China series), 2006.

External links
Juran Painting Gallery at China Online Museum
Landscapes Clear and Radiant: The Art of Wang Hui (1632-1717), an exhibition catalog from The Metropolitan Museum of Art (fully available online as PDF), which contains material on Juran (see index)

Southern Tang painters
Song dynasty landscape painters
Five Dynasties and Ten Kingdoms landscape painters
10th-century Chinese painters
Buddhist artists